The Rise and Fall of Legs Diamond is a 1960 crime film directed by Budd Boetticher and starring Ray Danton, Karen Steele and Elaine Stewart. The supporting cast features Warren Oates, Jesse White and Robert Lowery. The picture marked the film debut of Dyan Cannon and was nominated for an Academy Award for Best Costume Design for Howard Shoup.

Plot
In the 1920s, ambitious but smalltime thief Jack Diamond and his sickly brother Eddie Diamond move to New York City. Jack meets dance instructor Alice Shiffer, lies to her to date her and to steal a necklace from a jewelry store. After being incarcerated for a time, he works with Alice at her dance school while on probation.

He then gets hired as bodyguard of infamous Arnold Rothstein who gives him the nickname Legs. His plan is to supplant Rothstein with the intention of stealing his bootleg, drugs and gambling businesses. After Arnold is murdered, Legs Diamond sells protection. When he travels to Europe with Alice on a vacation, he sees in the newspaper that the New York underworld has changed with the National Prohibition Act. Legs returns to America and confronts the syndicate, demanding a cut from their operations. He kicks Alice out of his life and turns to Monica, who betrays him. Hit men enter his hotel room and shoot him dead. In the final scene, as his corpse is being removed on a stretcher, Alice says he was loved by many but that he loved nobody.

Cast
 Ray Danton as Jack "Legs" Diamond 
 Karen Steele as Alice Scott 
 Elaine Stewart as Monica Drake 
 Jesse White as Leo "Butcher" Bremer 
 Warren Oates as Eddie Diamond 
 Dyan Cannon (credited as Diane Cannon) as Dixie  
 Robert Lowery as Arnold Rothstein
 Richard Gardner as Mad Dog Coll
 Gordon Jones as Sgt. Joe Cassidy
 Frank de Kova as "The Chairman"

Frank de Kova's role is only listed as "The Chairman" of the new crime syndicate.  He was portraying Lucky Luciano, but as Luciano was alive at the time, it was decided not to name him specifically.

The lead role was first offered to Robert Evans. When he turned it down Warner Bros. Television contract star Ray Danton took the lead. Evans also had turned down the lead for The George Raft Story that Danton also played.

Danton reprised his role as Legs Diamond in Portrait of a Mobster (1961).

Production
Boetticher said the only actors he truly hated in his life were Gilbert Roland and Ray Danton. He says he wanted to make film like The Triumph of the Will ("the greatest picture I ever saw") "about one of the most despicable men of all time, Adolf Hitler. So I want to make a picture about a miserable, no good son-of-a-bitch that when you walk out of the theater, you say, "God, wasn't he great!" And then you take two steps, and you say, "wait a minute, he was a miserable son-of-a-bitch!"

He researched the film, found out all Diamond had done "and when I went back to Warner's and told them everything I'd learned, they wouldn't let me make the picture! So we had to clean it up a bit. We had twenty-four days on that; it was a good picture. "

Reception
From Howard Thompson of The New York Times:

After he saw the film, guitarist Hank Marvin was inspired to give the name of the film to his The Rise and Fall of Flingel Bunt.

In 2008, the American Film Institute nominated this film for its Top 10 Gangster Films list.

Musical remake
The film was adapted as a musical titled Legs Diamond that debuted on Broadway at the Mark Hellinger Theatre on December 26, 1988, and it closed on February 19, 1989 after 64 performances and 72 previews.

See also
 List of American films of 1960

References

External links 
 
 
 
 

1960 films
1960 crime films
1960s biographical films
American gangster films
American biographical films
1960s English-language films
Biographical films about gangsters
Biographical films about Depression-era gangsters
Films set in the 1920s
Films set in the 1930s
Films set in New York City
Warner Bros. films
Films scored by Leonard Rosenman
Films directed by Budd Boetticher
Films about Jewish-American organized crime
Cultural depictions of Legs Diamond
Cultural depictions of Arnold Rothstein
Cultural depictions of Mad Dog Coll
1960s American films